Mueang Phrae is the capital district of Phrae province, northern Thailand.

Geography
Neighboring districts are (from the southwest clockwise): Sung Men, Long, Nong Muang Khai, and Rong Kwang of Phrae Province; Na Muen of Nan province; and Tha Pla of Uttaradit province.

The Phi Pan Nam Range dominates the landscape of the district. One of the three basins of the Yom River flows near Mueang Phrae.

Administration
The district is divided into 20 sub-districts (tambons), which are further subdivided into 157 villages (mubans). Phrae itself is a town (thesaban mueang) and covers tambon Nai Wiang. There are three more townships (thesaban tambons): Thung Hong and Mae Lai both cover tambons of the same name, Cho Hae covers tambon Cho Hae and parts of Padaeng. There are a further 20 tambon administrative organizations (TAO).

Notable sites 
The home of the former rulers of Phrae, built in 1892, is now used as the governor's residence and has been promoted as a tourist destination by the Phrae provincial government.

References

Mueang Phrae